The Traditional Tune Archive (TTA) is the searchable digital library of traditional music from Ireland, Great Britain and North America organized alphabetically, by tune title, with alternate or additional titles and variants cross-referenced, music in standard and ABC notation, annotated information on history and context, along with references and internet links for further reference.

It is a curated Semantic Web Index in which the meanings (semantics) of information are organized in a way that makes it possible for the web to “understand” and satisfy the requests of people and machines to use the content. Thus, the aim is to allow the semantics of traditional music pieces —their properties, historical information and musicological traits, commentaries, etc.—  to be employed in an improved data structure that allows for myriad research possibilities.

The TTA is a non-profit, crowd-sourced venture developed by Andrew Kuntz and Valerio Pelliccioni,  curated by the administrators, and contains over 50,000 tunes with annotations. The TTA is licensed under a Creative Commons Attribution-NonCommercial-ShareAlike 3.0 Unported License.

Origins
The Traditional Tune Archive was originally “seeded” with the entire project Andrew Kuntz had been working on from 1996 to 2010, the Fiddler’s Companion tune index, in which tens of thousands of traditional melodies had been cataloged alphabetically by title into separate entries that also included descriptive information about the tune, including form, key, structure, fiddle tuning, source information, where it could be found in print and on sound recording.

Additionally, Andrew entered as much anecdotal information as he could find regarding how the tune was embedded in culture, its provenance, authorship, peculiarities, stories, and mention in the historical record, etc.—a pot pouri of material about the tune, whether factual, speculative, apocryphal, hopeful or simply amusing.

Initially, Andrew thought of each separate entry as simply a bin in which to store anything that was said or recorded about the tune, and he made little attempt to sort out fact from rumor, nor truth from speculation, leaving the qualitative work to others.

As the project matured, however (along with his own knowledge and experience), it became obvious that the annotated material needed organizing, and he began to employ a much more analytical and qualitative approach, attempting to discriminate between factual information and speculative, however culturally interesting, and to apply some discipline to speculative thoughts.

Andrew had no thoughts of abandoning anecdotal material, for it gives considerable information in and of itself of the cultural milieu that is the rich medium for traditional music, but rather to attempt only sorting out what was demonstrably or even reasonably certain from that which could not be verified.

One can read, if interested, the original introduction and premise  for the Fiddler’s Companion, which outlines him original thoughts about what the project was about and what I was trying to achieve, and judge if he has come anywhere near it.

Definitions
‘Traditional music’ is loosely defined as historical and contemporary melodies that are folk-based, either in original derivation or in practical usage, and have been primarily used for folk-based activities, such as folk dance and folk song,  and are also currently enjoyed by amateur players for personal enjoyment and for group playing in sessions.  The body of ‘traditional music’ also provides foundational material for a thriving music industry based on interpretation and performance, adaptation, imitation and innovation in its various subgenres, supporting semi-professional and professional musicians.

In the context of the TTA, traditional music is closely associated as use or potential use for dancing, and follows musical forms that developed in conjunction with, and accompaniment to,  folk dance.  Traditional dance music is usually binary in form, with contrasting two-strain melodies the majority (but not exclusively) in the form AB or ABAB.  The music is further categorized by types associated with different dances, including jigs, reels, hornpipes, schottisches, polkas, waltzes, etc.

Organization
The TTA is organized alphabetically, by tune title, with alternate or additional titles and variants cross-referenced.  Each tune has two pages, the first for music and bibliographic/demographic information, and the second featuring annotations on history, context, and more in-depth bibliographic and discographic information.

Tune information is recorded in individual data fields of which twelve elements are relationally organized and reportable via the “Query the Archive” function found under the “Archive” menu to the left of the index page.  Queries can be selected using the available fields.

Easy to use templates for recording tune entry information are provided by clicking “Add Tunes” under “The Archive” menu and are available for crowd sourcing.

The TTA is semantically organized in categories of tune characteristics:

Music
 Meter/Rhythm
 Time signature 
 Key (Tonic note, accidentals, Key/mode)
 Tune structure
Description
 Region
 Genre/Style
Context
 Composer/core source
 Historical/Geographical allegiances
 Alternate titles, closely related tunes

Tune Book 
 Citation of the earliest published or manuscript where the tune can be found
 A PDF standard notation transcription, when available

Audio Recording
 Citation of the earliest sound recording of the tune extent
 An mp3 version of the recording, when available

Theme Code Index 
 Theme codes of the first two measures of each tune

The codes at TTA use the system described in Charles Gore's 'The Scottish Fiddle Music Index' (The Amaising Publishing House Ltd, Musselburgh, 1994), which is in turn based on the work of the great Irish music scholar Breandán Breathnach

Theme Code Index has itself been useful in writing the commentaries to the tunes on the FARNE website, by providing titles for untitled tunes, identifying composers, and also in showing when a tune is NOT in one of the many publications listed by Gore.

Where possible tunes in the archive have been indexed using the Theme Code Index.

Annotations
 Tune annotations – A section for narrative comments about the tune, focusing on history, dissemination, tune family relationships, and contextual information such as influential popularizers and recordings,  and remarks on ‘placement in the tradition’.

Information is factual with supporting citations but ‘tune lore’ (i.e. non-factual, conjectural and/or speculative remarks should be identified as such. 
 Source for notated version – The source for the tune cited in printed or manuscript collections.
 Printed Sources – A list of all known published sources for the tune.
 Recorded Sources – A list of all known sound recordings of the tune.
 ‘See also listing at’— Internet links for further information.

Searchability - Information in the TTA data base can be searched in three ways:
 By entering keywords in the “Search Traditional Tune Archive” bar at the top right of each index page.
 By clicking on “The Index” under “The Archive Menu” on the left hand side of each page.   Clicking on “The Index” will reveal an alphabetically arranged list of tunes, with an alphabetical short cut at the top of the page for easier navigation.  Tunes are listed by title, sans any article words (A, An, The, La, Le, Les etc.) at the beginning of the title. 
By using the “Query the Archive” function found under “The Archive” menu on the left hand side of each index page.  “Query the Archive” will produce a report from fields selected.

Featured Tunes
Featured Tunes are articles selected and highlighted by editors as among the best TTA has to offer. They are used by editors as examples for writing other articles.
A small bronze star icon on the top right corner of an article's page indicates that the article is featured.

Mobile
The Traditional Tune Archive is also mobile.
One can access the site using his smartphone or tablet at the same web address getting a much more simplistic user interface, much more optimised for performance.

Logo
The TTA logo is the Universal Clef by Bathsheba Grossman who allowed the Traditional Tune Archive to use it.

This sculpture, in the words of the author, "is a sign of order and harmony for every note and instrument, voice and music. It is a single ribbon that follows itself through space, and due to its unobstructed length it rings like a bell, low and long".

External links
 The Fiddler Companion

Notes

Music libraries
Digital library projects
Traditional music
Creative Commons-licensed websites